A Mind to Kill is a Welsh television police detective series, that developed from a feature-length pilot episode first broadcast in 1991. The series stars Philip Madoc as protagonist DCI Noel Bain. Four series were broadcast between 1994 and 2002, though the Christmas special is sometimes counted as a separate series, bringing the total to five. The show first aired as Yr Heliwr on S4C, before being broadcast on Channel 5 in the UK.

The series was filmed in both English and in Welsh, with each scene being shot first in one language and then in the other. The series has since been dubbed into more than a dozen languages and shown all over the world. The series is set in South Wales, and features a variety of post-industrial, rural, urban and seaside landscapes. The pilot episode was filmed in the Aberystwyth area. All twenty-two episodes are available on DVD.

Synopsis
Philip Madoc plays Detective Chief Inspector Noel Bain, a man who looks back fondly to the days when policing involved chasing villains, playing rugby and drinking beer. However, he has come to realise that contemporary policing imposes dilemmas that no training manual could ever anticipate. He is a man out of time and seeks to protect the old way of life, and what he believes are important traditional values. Bain is a widower who has a tempestuous relationship with his daughter, Hannah.

Despite resenting the lack of time her father spent with the family because of police work, Hannah becomes a WPC on the same police force. Bain often sees his position as not just a job; but his raison d'être; meaning that his journey is often an emotional and painful one as the personal and professional universes collide. Bain has a close friendship with police pathologist Professor Margaret Edwards (Sharon Morgan), but his true feelings for her remain ambiguous.

Other regular actors included Gillian Elisa, Meic Povey and Geraint Lewis. Joining the regulars in the last series were Bryn Fôn, Ieuan Rhys, Huw Llyr and Elen Bowman. The series featured many guest spots from well known actors such as Margaret John, Ioan Gruffudd, Sue Jones-Davies, David Warner, Mark Lewis Jones, John Rhys-Davies, David Lyn, Archie Panjabi and Siân Phillips.

Reception
The Windsor Public Library stated that the series drew upon "Intricate plots, strongly drawn characters, and gritty authenticity", making it a "riveting Welsh drama series". Eclipse Magazine said of the series; "A Mind To Kill is a dark and twisty show... CSI's ancestor. Murder is the most extreme human action and stories sometimes play out against the most extraordinary of circumstances, e.g. a Miners' Strike, when the traditional way of life of the community is already under threat."

They continued by stating that; "There is a strong psychological element, and as the series proceeds, the stories begin to dig deeper into Bain’s subconscious. The unresolved death of his wife causes great mental anguish and torment, and his dealings with the people he meets and the crimes he investigates are not always as straightforward as they should be."

Episodes

Pilot (1991)

Series 1 (1994—1995)

Series 2 (1997)

Christmas Special (1998)

Series 3 (2001)

Series 4 (2002)

References

External links

British crime television series
S4C original programming
British drama television series
1990s British drama television series
2000s British drama television series
Channel 5 (British TV channel) original programming
1994 British television series debuts
2002 British television series endings
Television shows set in Wales
English-language television shows
Detective television series